DIC may refer to:

Biology and chemistry
 Diisopropylcarbodiimide, a reagent in organic chemistry
 Disseminated intravascular coagulation, a pathological activation of coagulation (blood clotting) mechanisms
 Dissolved inorganic carbon, the sum of inorganic carbon species in a solution

Companies
 D.I.C. (department store), a New Zealand department store chain
 DIC Corporation, a Japanese chemical company
 DIC Entertainment, a former film and television production company
 Dic Press, an imprint of VDM Publishing devoted to the reproduction of Wikipedia content
 Deposit Insurance Corporation of Japan
 Dubai International Capital, a private equity company

Technology
 Differential interference contrast microscopy, an illumination technique in optical microscopy
 Digital image correlation, an optical method that employs tracking and image registration techniques 
 Digital integrating computer, a digital implementation of a Differential Analyzer
 Dependency injection container, a dependency management technique in software development.

Other
 Democratic Indira Congress (Karunakaran), an Indian political party
 Deviance information criterion, a diagnostic statistic used in Bayesian model selection
 Dicyclic group
 Diploma of Imperial College, awarded by Imperial College London
 Drive-In Classics, a Canadian television station
 Drunk in charge, a drink driving crime in the United Kingdom
 Dubai Industrial City, a dedicated industrial city
 Dubai Internet City, an information technology park

See also
 DIK
 Dick (disambiguation)